Cletus Paul Fischer (June 11, 1925 – December 3, 2000) was an American football halfback. He played for the New York Giants in 1949.

References

1925 births
2000 deaths
American football halfbacks
Nebraska Cornhuskers football players
Nebraska Cornhuskers football coaches
New York Giants players